Kayla Lorette is a Canadian actress from Ladysmith, British Columbia. She is most noted for her performances in the film When the Storm Fades, for which she won the Vancouver Film Critics Circle Award for Best Supporting Actress in a Canadian Film in 2019, the television special The Second City Project, for which she was a Canadian Screen Award nominee for Best Performance in a Variety or Sketch Comedy Program or Series at the 4th Canadian Screen Awards in 2016, and the web series Space Riders: Division Earth, for which she was a Canadian Screen Award nominee for Best Lead Performance in a Web Program or Series at the 7th Canadian Screen Awards in 2019.

Her other credits have included the web series Everyone's Famous, Gary and His Demons and New Eden, the films She Stoops to Conquer, When the Storm Fades and Filth City, Emily in the US Dub of Thomas & Friends: All Engines Go!, and stage-based improvisational comedy as part of the duo The Sufferettes.

In 2020, she narrated a portion of the 8th Canadian Screen Awards along with her New Eden cocreator and costar Evany Rosen.

References

External links

21st-century Canadian actresses
21st-century Canadian comedians
Canadian television actresses
Canadian film actresses
Canadian web series actresses
Canadian voice actresses
Canadian sketch comedians
Canadian women comedians
Actresses from British Columbia
Living people
People from Ladysmith, British Columbia
Year of birth missing (living people)
Canadian Comedy Award winners